Conway is a national park in Queensland, Australia, 911 km northwest of Brisbane.  The park's main feature is the Conway Peninsula which is covered by the largest area of lowland tropical rainforest in Queensland outside Tropical North Queensland.

Walk-in bush camping is permitted however there are no established camp sites.  There are a number of walking tracks graded from easy to moderate.

The average elevation of the terrain is 44 meters.

Flora and Fauna 
Among the plant species in the park are dry vine thicket, mangroves, open forests with a grasstree understorey, paperbark and pandanus woodlands and others. Park is also home to two mound-building birds, the australian brush-turkey and the orange-footed scrubfowl.

See also

 Protected areas of Queensland

References

National parks of Queensland
Protected areas established in 1938
North Queensland